Valentyna Yevhenivna Shevchenko (born 2 October 1975 in Nosivka Raion) is a Ukrainian former cross-country skier who competed in the World Cup between the 1993–94 season and the 2016–17 season.

Career
She won the bronze medal in the 30 km event at the FIS Nordic World Ski Championships 2009 in Liberec.

Competing in four Winter Olympics, Shevchenko earned her best finish finished fifth in the 30 km at Salt Lake City in 2002.

She won the 30 km event at the Holmenkollen ski festival in 2008, as well as  La Sgambeda on 19 December 2010 in  Livigno, Italy.

Shevchenko carried the Ukrainian flag at the opening ceremony of the 2014 Winter Olympics.

Cross-country skiing results
All results are sourced from the International Ski Federation (FIS).

Olympic Games

World Championships
 1 medal – (1 bronze)

World Cup

Season titles
 1 title – (1 distance)

Season standings

Individual podiums
5 victories – (4 , 1 ) 
18 podiums – (14 , 4 )

References

External links
 
 
 

1975 births
Cross-country skiers at the 1998 Winter Olympics
Cross-country skiers at the 2002 Winter Olympics
Cross-country skiers at the 2006 Winter Olympics
Cross-country skiers at the 2010 Winter Olympics
Cross-country skiers at the 2014 Winter Olympics
Holmenkollen Ski Festival winners
Living people
Olympic cross-country skiers of Ukraine
Ukrainian female cross-country skiers
Tour de Ski skiers
FIS Nordic World Ski Championships medalists in cross-country skiing
Universiade medalists in cross-country skiing
Universiade gold medalists for Ukraine
Competitors at the 1999 Winter Universiade
Competitors at the 2003 Winter Universiade
Sportspeople from Chernihiv Oblast